Spodoptera is a genus of moths of the family Noctuidae erected by Achille Guenée in 1852. Many are known as pest insects. The larvae are sometimes called armyworms. The roughly thirty species are distributed across six continents.

Description
No tufts behind collar as in Euplexia, but only tufts present on metathorax. Scales much smoother. Abdominal tufts slight. Fore tibial tufts are very developed. Cilia slightly crenulated. Antennae almost simple.

Species

 Spodoptera abyssinia Guenée, 1852
 Spodoptera albula (Walker, 1857) (orth. var. S. albulum)
 Spodoptera androgea (Stoll, [1782])
 Spodoptera angulata (Gaede, 1935)
 Spodoptera apertura (Walker, 1865)
 Spodoptera cilium Guenée, 1852 – grasslawn armyworm
 Spodoptera compta (Walker, 1869)
 Spodoptera connexa (Wileman, 1914)
 Spodoptera depravata (Butler, 1879)
 Spodoptera dolichos (Fabricius, 1794) – sweet potato armyworm
 Spodoptera eridania (Cramer) – southern armyworm
 Spodoptera evanida Schaus, 1914
 Spodoptera excelsa Rougeot & Laporte, 1983
 Spodoptera exempta (Walker, [1857]) – African armyworm
 Spodoptera exigua (Hübner, [1808]) – beet armyworm
 Spodoptera fasciculata (Berio, 1973)
 Spodoptera frugiperda (Smith, 1797) – fall armyworm
 Spodoptera hipparis (Druce, 1889)
 Spodoptera latifascia (Walker, 1856) – velvet armyworm
 Spodoptera littoralis (Boisduval, 1833) – African cotton leafworm
 Spodoptera litura (Fabricius, 1775) – Oriental leafworm moth
 Spodoptera malagasy Viette, 1967
 Spodoptera marima (Schaus, 1904) syn. S. ornithogalli below
 Spodoptera mauritia (Boisduval, 1833) – lawn armyworm
 Spodoptera ochrea (Hampson, 1909)
 Spodoptera ornithogalli (Guenée, 1852) – yellow-striped armyworm
 Spodoptera pecten Guenée, 1852
 Spodoptera pectinicornis (Hampson, 1895) – water-lettuce moth
 Spodoptera peruviana (Walker, 1865)
 Spodoptera picta (Guérin-Méneville, [1838])
 Spodoptera praefica (Grote, 1875) – western yellowstriped armyworm
 Spodoptera pulchella (Herrich-Schäffer, 1868) – Caribbean armyworm
 Spodoptera roseae (Schaus, 1923)
 Spodoptera semiluna (Hampson, 1909)
 Spodoptera teferii Laporte, 194
 Spodoptera triturata (Walker, [1857])
 Spodoptera umbraculata (Walker, 1858)

References

External links
 
 

 
Caradrinini
Taxa named by Achille Guenée
Insect pests of millets